Terry Regan is the name of:

Terry Regan (footballer), English footballer
Terry Regan (rugby league), Australian rugby league player